Perkins County is the name of two counties in the United States:

 Perkins County, Nebraska 
 Perkins County, South Dakota